Craspedoxantha manengubae is a species of tephritid or fruit flies in the genus Craspedoxantha of the family Tephritidae.

Distribution
Cameroon.

References

Tephritinae
Insects described in 1915
Diptera of Africa
Taxa named by Paul Gustav Eduard Speiser